K222 or K-222 may refer to:

K-222 (1960–1962 Kansas highway)
K-222 (1960–2000 Kansas highway)
HMS Teviot (K222), a former UK Royal Navy ship 
Soviet submarine K-222, a former Soviet Union submarine